Max Lefèvre (born 9 December 1985), is a French racing driver from Paris.

After karting, he moved up to car racing at the relatively late age of 21 winning the French Formula Ford. In 2008 he moved to Formula Renault 2.0 West European Cup and won the challenger cup. In 2009 he signed to race for Condor Motorsports in the Atlantic Championship, finishing 10th in the championship.

External links
Max Lefèvre Official Website

1985 births
French racing drivers
Atlantic Championship drivers
Formula Renault 2.0 WEC drivers
Living people